Erik Køppen (9 March 1923 – 10 November 2019) was a Danish footballer who played as a right-back. He made 21 appearances for the Denmark national team from 1949 to 1956.

References

External links
 
 

1923 births
2019 deaths
Footballers from Copenhagen
Danish men's footballers
Association football fullbacks
Denmark international footballers
Danish Superliga players
Kjøbenhavns Boldklub players